Bykovo  was a small regional airport serving Moscow, Russia, of which only the runway remains. It has one 7,250 ft (2,210 m) runway. The airport served mainly short-haul domestic flights due to its short runway.

History
Bykovo Airport first opened in 1933. The airport first had a grass-surfaced runway. During World War II it was rebuilt (1000 × 80 m; brick-covered). In 1960, it was rebuilt again. In 1975, the terminal building was built (capable of serving 400 passengers per hour); in 1975, it served 1.5 million passengers. The airport was home to the charter flights department of Centre-Avia.

On 18 October 2010, passenger operations at the airport ended due to the expiration of lease terms with the management company. In 2011 the terminal building was demolished.

The airport shared its grounds with the Bykovo Aircraft Repair Facility, specializing in repairs and overhauls of Soloviev D-30 turbofans; the factory continues to use the runway for cargo delivery.

The new Zhukovsky International Airport (a.k.a. Ramenskoye) is a few kilometers southeast of Bykovo Airport.

References

External links
 ASN Accident history for UUBB

Defunct airports
Airports built in the Soviet Union
Airports in Moscow Oblast
Airports established in 1933
Airports disestablished in 2010
1933 establishments in the Soviet Union
2010 disestablishments in Russia